A motion for more definite statement in many jurisdictions in the United States, and under United States federal law, is a means of obtaining a more detailed motion from the opposing party in a civil case before interposing a responsive pleading.

In federal jurisprudence, the motion is permitted by Rule 12(e) of The Federal Rules of Civil Procedure. The presiding judge will respond either by granting the motion or striking it from the record if it is found to be without legal merit. The motion must contain a point-by-point rebuttal, with each point numbered, and ideally should reference some case law in support of the motion.

In the Commonwealth of Virginia, a motion seeking such relief is called a motion for a bill of particulars.

References

Law of the United States
Civil procedure